Encyclops is a genus of beetles in the family Cerambycidae, containing the following species:

 Encyclops caerulea (Say, 1826)
Encyclops californica Van Dyke, 1920
 Encyclops coerulea Say, 1827
 Encyclops concinna Holzschuh, 1991
 Encyclops hubeiensis Ohbayashi & Wang, 2004
 Encyclops macilentus Kraatz, 1879
 Encyclops olivaceus Bates, 1884
 Encyclops viridipennis Makihara, 1978
 Encyclops x-signata Chiang, 1981

References

Lepturinae